is a military base of the Japan Ground Self-Defense Force, located in Higashine, Yamagata prefecture, Japan.

History
In 1942, the Imperial Japanese Navy Air Service established a training facility known as the Jimmachi Naval Air Base. The facilities were taken over by the United States Army in 1945 after the surrender of Japan following World War II. The base was initially occupied by the 674th Airborne Artillery Battalion of the  11th Airborne Division and named Camp Younghans after 1st Lt Raymond M Younghans who was killed in action on 31 March 1945 on Luzon in the Philippines. The base was home to the 48th and 49th Field Artillery Battalions of the 7th Infantry Division along with a number of other American Army units until September 1950, when the bulk of American forces were redeployed to Korea for the Korean War.

From September 1954, all of the American artillery units formerly based in Hokkaido were relocated to Camp Younghans, including the 61st, 77th, 82nd and 99th Artillery Battalions of the 1st Cavalry Division.

The base was returned to the control of Japan in 1956. The same year, the JGDSF’s first mountaineering regiment was established at Ōtawara, Tochigi in the Nasu Mountains. This regiment was elevated to form the basis of the JGSDF 6th Division on 15 August 1962, with responsibility for the defense of Fukushima, Miyagi and Yamagata prefectures. The headquarters of the new division was JGSDF Camp Jinmachi.

Organization
JGSDF North East Army (HQ Sendai)
 6th Division HQ
 20th Infantry Regiment note 1
 6th Combat Engineering Battalion
 6th Signals Battalion
 6th Aviation Squadron, at Yamagata Airport, flying UH-1J and OH-6D helicopters
 6th NBC Protection Battalion
 6th Logistic Support Regiment

References

External links

Official home page 

Jinmachi
Buildings and structures in Yamagata Prefecture
Higashine, Yamagata
1942 establishments in Japan